The Ceylon Evangelical Lutheran Church (CELC), formerly known as Lanka Lutheran Church, is a Lutheran body in Sri Lanka. It is a denomination of around 5000 members and has been in fellowship with the Lutheran Church–Missouri Synod (LCMS) since 2001. It is a full member of the International Lutheran Council.

History 
In the 1927, the Lutheran Church–Missouri Synod began missionary work in what was then known as Ceylon as an outgrowth of its work in India. The work was centered on the Tamil-speaking Hindus in the tea estate region central Sri Lanka. In 1978, the churches were registered with the Sri Lankan government. In 1998, the LCMS resident missionaries were withdrawn from the country. The name Lanka Lutheran Church was adopted in about the year 2000. In 2001, the Lanka Lutheran Church became a partner church of the LCMS and joined the International Lutheran Council. It also joined the Lutheran World Federation, reporting a membership of 1,200. The church lost its government registration in about 2006. By 2009 it reported having 5,324 baptized members. 

In 2013, LCMS missionaries returned and worked to revive the church body. In September 2017, the first convocation of the Ceylon Evangelical Lutheran Church adopted a new constitution; previous constitutions had merely been copies of those of the India Evangelical Lutheran Church. The new name of the church was chosen to show that the Lutheran church had been in the country since at least the 1920s. The convocation also ordained a new pastor for the first time in ten years and established the Ceylon Evangelical Lutheran Publishing House.

On October 9 2022, the Ceylon Evangelical Lutheran Church (CELC) consecrated its first Bishop, Rev. Arumanayagam Arulchelvan. The consecration was conducted by Archbishop Joseph Omolo of the Evangelical Lutheran Church in Kenya (ELCK), joined also by ELCK Bishops Kispin and Titus.

Statistics 
The CELC has 16 congregations, of which 5 have their own church buildings. Most of the congregations are located in the Central Province, with one each in the Northern, Sabaragamuwa, Uva, and Western provinces.

The CELC is served by four pastors and five evangelists. Given that there are fewer pastors than congregations, the pastors attempt to visit each congregation at least once a month to administer Holy Communion.

See also 
 Christianity in Sri Lanka

References

External links 

International Lutheran Council members
Lutheran World Federation members
Protestantism in Sri Lanka
Lutheranism in Asia